Vasilis Avlonitis (1 January 1904 – 10 March 1970) was one of the most famous old-school Greek comedians. He performed in numerous films and stage productions in the mid to late 20th century.

Vasilis Avlonitis is best known for his collaboration in films with Georgia Vasiliadou; he usually played her husband, brother or neighbour. Together they would cause laugh since he portrays the fat guy and she would be the ugly funny lady having problems with him. They would get calm at the end of the film, by resolving their arguments and/or marrying each other.

Avlonitis has also carried demanding drama roles, such as the leading character in the film Tis nyhtas ta kamomata.

Filmography
Limani ton dakryon (Λιμάνι των Δακρυών) 1929
Dipli thysia 1945
Allos, O 1952
Haroumeno xekinima 1954
Oraia ton Athinon, I 1954 .... Zahos Markas
Laterna, ftoheia kai filotimo 1955 .... Pavlaras
Glenti - lefta ki agapi 1955 .... Lavrentis
Kafetzou, I 1956 .... Nikitas
Tis nyhtas ta kamomata 1957 .... policeman
Laterna, ftoheia kai garyfallo 1957 .... Pavlaras
Kata lathos babas 1957
Ehei theio to koritsi 1957 .... Jimis
Barba Giannis, o kanatas 1957 .... Barba Giannis
Amaxaki, To 1957
Tzitzikas ki o mermigas, O 1958 .... Loulis
Makrya ap' ton kosmo 1958 .... Isidoros
Leftas, O 1958 .... Theodosis Mentikas
Eispraktoraki, To 1958
4 nyfes ki enas gabros 1958 .... Prokopis
Mia zoi tin ehoume 1958 .... warden
Sarakatsanissa 1959
Thisavros tou makariti, O 1959 .... Neokosmos
Kyria dimarhos, I 1960 .... Anargyros Prokopis
Kalimera Athina 1960 .... Menelaos Stasinopoulos
Agrimi, To 1960 .... Stasinopoulos
Agapoula mou 1960
Hionati kai ta 7 gerontopallikara, I 1960 .... Efstathios
Mana mou, ton agapisa 1961
Klearhos, I Marina kai o kontos, O 1961 .... Klearhos Zougalas
Exypno pouli, To 1961 .... Mihos
Terma ta difraga 1962 .... Agisilaos
Pezodromio 1962
Otan leipi i gata! 1962 .... Loukas
Mihalios tou 14ou Syntagmatos, O 1962 .... Col. Karadimos
Koroido gabre 1962 .... Diamantis Sarantopoulos
Karpouzaki, To 1962
Gabros gia klamata 1962
Gabroi tis Eftyhias, Oi 1962 .... Vagelis Tarnianis
Exypnoi kai koroida... 1962 .... Pelopidas
Ellinida kai o erotas, I 1962
Triti kai 13 1963 .... man at the races
Thymios sti hora tou strip-tiz, O 1963
Tempeloskylo, To 1963 .... Alexandros Pelekanos
Pseftothodoros 1963 .... Thodoros
Mikroi kai megaloi en drasei 1963 .... Faidon
Lenio, i voskopoula 1963 .... Hronis
Enas vlakas... me patenta!
Anipsios mou, o Manolis, O 1963 .... Aristidis
Agapisa kai ponesa 1963
Tria koritsia ap' tin Amerika 1964 .... Nikos Nikolaidis
Soferina, I 1964 .... Gylos
Proikothires 1964 .... Prokopis
Pikri mou, agapi 1964
Paras kai o foukaras, O 1964 .... Mr. Panagakos
Mia 'vdomada ston paradeiso 1964
Lagopodaros, O 1964
Itan oloi tous... koroida! 1964 .... Giangos
Giannis takane thalassa, O 1964 .... Kostas
Allos... gia to ekatommyrio! 1964 .... Babis
Kai oi... 14 itan yperohoi! 1965
Ena exypno exypno... moutro 1965 .... Potis
Dyskoloi dromoi 1965
Dyhtia tis dropis, Ta 1965
Sklavoi tis moiras 1966
Poniros praktor Karagiozis 1966 .... Barba-Giorgos
Meletis stin Ameso Drasi, O 1966 .... Isaias Kontomakris
Fifis, o aktypitos 1966 .... Panagos
Isaia, horeve 1966 .... Isaias Kontomakris
Eho dikaioma na s' agapo! 1966 .... Timoleon Bakatsolas
Diplopennies 1966 .... Vangelis
Babas mou, o teddyboys, O 1966 .... Dodos Varlentis
Adelfi mou thelei xylo, I 1966
Siko, horepse syrtaki 1967 .... Prokopis
Tosa oneira stous dromous 1968
Petheropliktos, O 1968 .... Theofrastos Karatourlekis
Koroida, i valitsa mou ki ego..., Ta 1969 .... Stelakis
Kathe katergaris ston pago tou 1969 .... Kyriakoulis
Fovatai o Giannis to therio... 1969 .... Thodoris
Arhontissa tou limaniou, I 1969
Aristokratissa kai o alitis, I 1969 .... Stratos

External links

Biography of Vassilis Avlonitis 

Male actors from Athens
Greek comedians
Greek male stage actors
Greek male film actors
1904 births
1970 deaths
20th-century Greek male actors
20th-century comedians
Greek male silent film actors